Elections to the French National Assembly were held in Senegal on 17 June 1951 as part of the wider French elections. Two members were elected from the territory, both of which were won by the Senegalese Democratic Bloc. Abbas Gueye and Léopold Sédar Senghor were the two elected members.

Results

References

1951 in Senegal
Elections in Senegal
Senegal
Senegal